Kim Clijsters defeated Mary Pierce in the final, 6–3, 6–1 to win the women's singles tennis title at the 2005 US Open. It was her first major singles title and first of an eventual three US Open titles.

Svetlana Kuznetsova was the defending champion, but was defeated by Ekaterina Bychkova in the first round. Kuznetsova became the first US Open champion to lose in the first round of her title defense.

This was the first major tournament in which Maria Sharapova competed as the world No. 1. She was defeated in the semifinals by Clijsters. This was also the final major appearance for former world No. 2 and 1994 Wimbledon champion Conchita Martínez.

Seeds

Qualifying

Draw

Finals

Top half

Section 1

Section 2

Section 3

Section 4

Bottom half

Section 5

Section 6

Section 7

Section 8

Championship match statistics

References

External links
 Drawsheet Source
2005 US Open – Women's draws and results at the International Tennis Federation

Women's Singles
US Open (tennis) by year – Women's singles
2005 in women's tennis
2005 in American women's sports